Catocala weigerti is a moth in the family Erebidae. It is found in Turkey.

References

weigerti
Moths described in 1999
Moths of Asia